Khasnor Johan is a Malaysian author and historian.

Early and personal life
Johan married Australian political scientist and author Harold Crouch in 1973.

Education
Johan studied at the University of Malaya (in Kuala Lumpur). Her master's thesis, The Malay College, Kuala Kangsar, 1905-1941: British Policy of Education for Employment in the Federated Malay States. was published in 1969. Like her husband, Johan attained her PhD at Monash University in Melbourne. Her thesis, published in 1974, was The Administrative Elite in the Federated Malay States: An Aspect of Malaysian Social History.

Career
From 1974 to 1992, Johan taught history at National University of Malaysia Crouch also taught at the university, his tenure from 1976 to 1990. In 1991 he began teaching at Australian National University in Canberra. Johan retired from teaching in 1992 and moved to Canberra. She was living in Canberra in 2002.

Published works
Johan published works between 1969 and 2005 in English.

 
  Old Boys Association. The Malaysian Branch of the Royal Asiatic Society.

See also
 Malay College Kuala Kangsar

References

Further reading
 

20th-century Malaysian historians
Cultural historians
Social historians
1968 births
Living people
Malaysian women writers
Women historians
Academic staff of the National University of Malaysia
University of Malaya alumni
Monash University alumni
Place of birth missing (living people)
21st-century Malaysian historians
20th-century Malaysian women writers
21st-century Malaysian women writers